Graciela Belén González Mendoza (born December 27, 1986), professionally known as Lali González is a Paraguayan theatre, television and film actress. Her breakout film role was playing Liz in the multiawarded Paraguayan film 7 Boxes.

Lali is known for her performances in films from Paraguay, Argentina, Colombia and Honduras. She is among the first Paraguayan actresses playing a co-leading role in a foreign accent to her native accent, in the Argentinian film El Jugador, which made her become the first Paraguayan actress to be featured on the streaming platform Netflix.

In April 2022, it was announced that Lali was nominated for the Martín Fierro awards in the category of leading actress in fiction, for her role in the Argentine telenovela La 1-5/18 from El Trece network.

Early life 
Lali was trained essentially as a stage actress. She graduated from the theatre school El Estudio in 2010. She also holds a law degree from the Universidad Católica Nuestra Señora de la Asunción.

Career

Television 
Her first appearance on screen was in 2010, as she played the main role in the second chapter of the television series La Herencia de Caín, directed by Paraguayan film and theatre director Agustín Núñez.

Films 
Lali began appearing in movies in 2010. She played Liz in the Paraguayan film 7 Boxes, a film nominated to the 27th Edition of the Goya Awards, in the category "Best Foreign Film in Spanish", featured in more than 25 international film festivals and released in numerous different countries.

Since 2012, Lali has not stopped working in the film industry. In that year, she played Irma in the Paraguayan-Argentinian movie Lectura según Justino, directed by Arnaldo André, and shared cast alongside well-known Argentinian actors Julieta Cardinali and Mike Amigorena.

She appeared in Latin American films after being cast to work in Argentina, Colombia, Brazil and Honduras. In 2013 she worked with the Argentinian director Daniel Gagliano in the movie El hijo buscado, along with renowned actor Rafael Ferro. In November of the same year she was part of the Colombian film Revenge strategy by director Carlos Varela.

In 2014, she was invited to be part of the cast of the Paraguayan film Luna de cigarras, directed by Jorge Díaz de Bedoya. Lali also performed in Mangoré, a Paraguayan film directed by Chilean Luis Vera, along with famous Mexican actor Damián Alcázar.

In October 2014, Lali represented Paraguay in the jury for the category "Fiction Feature Film" of the First Film Festival of the Three Borders in Misiones, Argentina.

In 2015, she was cast for the Honduran film A Place in the Caribbean, by director Juan Carlos Fanconi. She starred along with Gastón Pauls, Gabriela de la Garza, José Zúñiga and Rodrigo Guirao Díaz.

Her work includes the Argentinian film El jugador (2016), casting along Pablo Rago and Alejandro Awada. With this movie, Lali became the first Paraguayan actress to appear in the popular streaming platform Netflix, in July 2018. She also starred in the Paraguayan film La Redención (2018), directed by Herib Godoy. This "road movie" combines the story with war scenes from the Chaco War, and Lali plays Marlene, a young woman driving her grandfather around, in a journey to discover his memories from the war battles.

Lali can also be seen in the 2018 Argentinian-Paraguayan movie Gracias Gauchito by Argentinian director Cristian Jure, and the Argentinian movie Los que vuelven, directed by Laura Casabé.

Theatre 
In theatre, Lali stands as an actress and also as a producer of successful plays, such as Recién casados (2013), Rostros sagrados (2013–14 and 2016) and Veridicas (2017). The latter is a play based on internet videos made for her YouTube channel. Lali also was in the Paraguayan cast of the international play Toc Toc, premiered in Paraguay in 2014.

Personal life 
In 2016 Lali married Paraguayan music producer Walter Riveros. In 2019 she gave birth to the couple's first child, Rafaela.

Filmography

Television

Theatre

Other work

Standup comedy

Mentions

Awards and nominations

References

External links

 Official Site

Universidad Católica Nuestra Señora de la Asunción alumni
People from Asunción
Living people
Paraguayan film actresses
Paraguayan television actresses
Paraguayan stage actresses
21st-century Paraguayan actresses
1986 births